Operation Nordwind was launched by German ground forces on 31 December 1944 against U.S. and French ground forces in the Rhineland-Palatinate and the Alsace and Lorraine regions of southwestern Germany and northeastern France as part of the European Theatre in World War II. It ended on 25 January 1945.

North of Strasbourg 

Allied Forces

 Sixth Army Group
Lieutenant General Jacob L. Devers

Forces deployed North to South:

 US Seventh Army
Lieutenant General Alexander McC. Patch
  XV Corps
 Major General Wade H. Haislip
  103rd Infantry Division (Maj. Gen. Charles Haffner)
  44th Infantry Division (Brig. Gen. William F. Dean)
  100th Infantry Division (Maj. Gen. Withers A. Burress)
  63rd Infantry Division (Brig. Gen. Frederick Harris)
  VI Corps
 Major General Edward H. Brooks
  45th Infantry Division (Maj. Gen. Robert Frederick)
  70th Infantry Division (Brig. Gen. Thomas Herren)
  42nd Infantry Division (Maj. Gen. Henry Linden)
  79th Infantry Division (Maj. Gen. Ira Wyche)
  French 2nd Armored Division (Gen. Div. Philippe Leclerc de Hauteclocque)

Axis Forces

Army Group G
Generaloberst Johannes Blaskowitz

First Army
Generalleutnant Hans von Obstfelder
  25th Panzergrenadier Division (Oberst Arnold Burmeister)
  21st Panzer Division (Generalleutnant Edgar Feuchtinger)
  6th SS Mountain Division Nord (SS-Gruppenführer Karl-Heinrich Brenner)
 XIII SS Corps
 SS-Obergruppenführer Max Simon
 19th Volksgrenadier Division (Generalleutnant Walter Wißmath)
 36th Volksgrenadier Division (Generalmajor Helmut Kleikamp)
  17th SS Panzergrenadier Division Götz von Berlichingen (SS-Standartenführer Hans Lingner)
 XC Corps
 General der Flieger Erich Petersen
 559th Volksgrenadier Division (Generalleutnant Kurt Freiherr von Mühlen)
 257th Volksgrenadier Division (Generalmajor Erich Seidel)
 LXXXIX Corps
 General der Infanterie Gustav Höhne
 361st Volksgrenadier Division (Generalmajor Alfred Philippi)
 245th Infantry Division (Generalleutnant Edwin Sander)
 256th Volksgrenadier Division (Generalmajor Gerhard Franz)

South of Strasbourg (Colmar Pocket) 

Allied Forces

 Sixth Army Group (cont.)
Lieutenant General Jacob L. Devers

Forces deployed North to South:

 French First Army
Lieutenant General Jean de Lattre de Tassigny
 II Corps
 Géneral Joseph de Goislard de Monsabert
  1st Armored Division (Gén. Aimé Sudré)
  9th Colonial Infantry Division (Gén. Joseph Magnan)
  2nd Moroccan Infantry Division (Gén. Marcel Carpentier)
  4th Moroccan Mountain Division (Gén. Réne de Hesdin)
  5th Armored Division (Gén. Henri de Vernejoul)
  10th Infantry Division    (Gén. Pierre Billotte)
  US XXI Corps
 Major General Frank W. Milburn
  12th Armored Division (Maj. Gen. Roderick R. Allen)
  14th Armored Division (Maj. Gen. Albert Smith)
  36th Infantry Division (Maj. Gen. John Dahlquist)
 I Corps
 Géneral Antoine Béthouart
  1st Infantry March Division (Gén. Diego Brosset)
  3rd Algerian Infantry Division (Gén. Augustin Guillaume)

Axis Forces

Army Group Upper Rhine
Reichsführer-SS Heinrich Himmler

Nineteenth Army
General der Infanterie Siegfried Rasp
 10th SS Panzer Division Frundsberg (SS-Brigadeführer Heinz Harmel)
 LXIV Corps
 General der Infanterie Helmut Thumm
 189th Infantry Division (Generalmajor Eduard Zorn)
 198th Infantry Division (Generalmajor Otto Schiel)
 708th Volksgrenadier Division (Generalmajor Wilhelm Bleckwenn)
 16th Infantry Division
 LXIII Corps
 General der Infanterie Erich Abraham
 338th Infantry Division (Generalmajor Konrad Barde)
 159th Infantry Division (Generalmajor Heinrich Bürky)
 716th Infantry Division (Generalmajor Wolf Ewert)
 269th Infantry Division (Generalleutnant Hans Wagner)
 XIV SS Corps
 SS-Obergruppenführer Erich von dem Bach-Zelewski
 553rd Volksgrenadier-Division (Generalmajor Gerhard Hüther)
 10th SS Panzer Division Frundsberg (from 15 January) (SS-Brigadeführer Heinz Harmel)

Notes

References

Sources 
 
 
 
 
 
 
 14th Armored Division Combat History
 The NORDWIND Offensive (January 1945) on the website of the 100th Infantry Division Association contains a list of German primary sources on the operation.

World War II orders of battle